The 1908 Iowa State Normals football team represented Iowa State Normal School (later renamed University of Northern Iowa) as an independent during the 1908 college football season. In its first season under head coach Clayton B. Simmons, the team compiled a 5–0 record, shut out four of five opponents, and outscored all opponents by a total of 94 to 5.

Schedule

References

Iowa State Normals
Northern Iowa Panthers football seasons
College football undefeated seasons
Iowa State Normals football